Kihniö is a municipality of Finland.

It is located in the region of Pirkanmaa.

The municipality is unilingually Finnish.

Politics
Results of the 2011 Finnish parliamentary election in Kihniö:

True Finns   53.2%
Centre Party   15.5%
Christian Democrats   14.4%
National Coalition Party   6.5%
Social Democratic Party   5.9%
Communist Party of Finland   2.3%
Green League   1.1%
Left Alliance   0.5%
Pirate Party   0.5%

Results of the 2021 Finnish municipal elections, resulted in the True Finns being the largest group on the Kihniö council, in Kihniö.

References

External links

Municipality of Kihniö – Official website

 
Populated places established in 1920